Energy Delta Institute (EDI) is an international energy business school, with a primary focus on natural gas. EDI was founded in 2002 by Gasunie, GasTerra, Gazprom and the University of Groningen, later joined by Royal Dutch Shell.

EDI coordinates research projects and organises training programmes with a focus on the economic, management, legal and geopolitical aspects of the energy business.
In 2017 EDI merged with Energy Academy Europe and Energy Valley and became part of New Energy Coalition.

Business schools in the Netherlands
Energy companies of the Netherlands